The eThekwini Metropolitan Municipality council consists of 222 members elected by mixed-member proportional representation. 111 councillors are elected by first-past-the-post voting in 111 wards, while the remaining 111 are chosen from party lists so that the total number of party representatives is proportional to the number of votes received.

Results 
The following table shows the composition of the council after past elections.

December 2000 election

The following table shows the results of the 2000 election.

March 2006 election

The following table shows the results of the 2006 election.

May 2011 election

The following table shows the results of the 2011 election.

August 2016 election

The following table shows the results of the 2016 election.

November 2021 election

The following table shows the results of the 2021 election.

By-elections from November 2021
The following by-elections were held to fill vacant ward seats in the period since the election in November 2021.

After the death of the DA councillor in ward 10, a by-election was held on 2 November, consisting of candidates from the DA, ANC, IFP, EFF and eThekwini deputy mayor and Abantu Batho Congress (ABC) leader Philani Mavundla. The DA retained the seat, increasing its support from 80% to 95%, with Mavundla coming third, on 1%.

After the murder of the ANC councillor in ward 99, a by-election was held on 14 December. The DA and the IFP agreed on an electoral pact, with the DA standing aside, and asking its supporters to vote for the IFP candidate. The IFP won 62% of the vote, with the ANC second on 36%.

References

eThekwini
elections in KwaZulu-Natal
EThekwini Metropolitan Municipality